Rogelio López III (born July 29, 1980) is a Mexican racing driver from Aguascalientes.

López won the 2006 Desafío Coronachampionship, and went to the United States to drive the No. 03 Telmex/Lucas Oil Dodge in the NASCAR Grand National Division, Busch East Series for the 2007 season.

He got his first win in the Busch East Series during his rookie season, winning on July 21, 2007, at the Music City Motorplex in Nashville. He eventually went on to finish 7th in the standings with one win, five top-5 finishes, and six top-10 finishes.

He has two NASCAR Nationwide Series starts, both of them at Mexico City, in 2006 and 2007. He finished 29th on both occasions.

López competed in the 2007 Toyota All-Star Showdown, earning a 13th-place finish.

He is most famous for his 2006 blow-over in the NASCAR West Series at California Speedway in Fontana, California. While racing with Johnny Borneman, the two made contact coming out of turn 2. Lopez's car went airborne and flipped over. His car slid on its roof for several hundred feet before flipping over back onto the wheels. Lopez was uninjured and walked away from the incident.

He returned to make eight starts in the NASCAR Camping World East Series in 2008 and finished 21st in points. That same year, he became NASCAR México champion.

Motorsports career results

NASCAR
(key) (Bold – Pole position awarded by qualifying time. Italics – Pole position earned by points standings or practice time. * – Most laps led.)

Busch Series

Autozone West Series

References

External links
 

1980 births
Living people
Mexican racing drivers
NASCAR drivers
Sportspeople from Aguascalientes